Aleksandr Sergeyevich Dzasokhov is the former head of the Republic of North Ossetia–Alania.

Biography
He was born 3 April 1934, in Vladikavkaz, graduated in 1957 from the North Caucasus Mining Metallurgical Institute and holds a doctorate in politics. From 1992 - 1993, he was a people's deputy of Russian Federation and from 1993–1995, deputy of the State Duma of the Russian Federation. On 18 January 1998, elected president of North Ossetia with 76% of the vote and was re-elected on 27 January 2002, with 56,02% of the vote.

He voluntarily quit his post on 31 May 2005 and was succeeded by Taimuraz Mamsurov. He is currently a Representative of the Republic of North Ossetia in the Federation Republic.

On 13 January 2006, he testified at the trial of Nur-Pashi Kulayev, the lone surviving terrorist from School No. 1 in Beslan. Two buses full of victims arrived in Vladikavkaz on that day to see his long-awaited court appearance. Although many victims consider Dzasokhov among of those guilty for the Beslan school hostage crisis from 1 - 3 September 2004, the situational investigation carried out by the Prosecutor General's Office determined that no officials were to blame for the deaths, so he could testify without fear of legal ramifications for himself.

Dzasokhov is a Doctor of Political Science, Ph.D., author of several books and numerous articles. He speaks several foreign languages. Member of Russian Academy of Arts. In 1973 he defended his thesis "The processes of formation of the newly independent states" (a part-time graduate of the Central Committee Academy of Social Sciences).

Honours and awards
 Order "For Merit to the Fatherland";
2nd class (30 March 2004) - for outstanding contribution to the socio-economic development of the construction of federal relations and strengthening inter-ethnic harmony
3rd class (17 March 2001) - for outstanding contribution to strengthening Russian statehood, friendship and cooperation between nations
4th class (23 April 2009) - for services to law-and long-term fruitful work
 Order of the October Revolution (1981)
 Order of the Red Banner of Labour (1971)
 Order of Friendship of Peoples (1984)
 Medal "In Commemoration of the 850th Anniversary of Moscow" (1997)
 Medal "In Commemoration of the 1000th Anniversary of Kazan" (2005)
Order of Honour (2014)
 State Awards of Afghanistan, Hungary, Vietnam, and several other states
 Order of Holy Prince Daniel of Moscow, 1st class (Russian Orthodox Church)
 Honorary Member of Russian Academy of Arts

References

1934 births
Living people
People from Vladikavkaz
First convocation members of the State Duma (Russian Federation)
Second convocation members of the State Duma (Russian Federation)
Ambassadors of the Soviet Union to Syria
Heads of North Ossetia–Alania
Honorary Members of the Russian Academy of Arts
Politburo of the Central Committee of the Communist Party of the Soviet Union members
Presidium of the Supreme Soviet
Secretariat of the Central Committee of the Communist Party of the Soviet Union members
Beslan school siege
Recipients of the Order "For Merit to the Fatherland", 2nd class
Recipients of the Order "For Merit to the Fatherland", 3rd class
Recipients of the Order "For Merit to the Fatherland", 4th class
Recipients of the Order of Friendship (South Ossetia)
Recipients of the Order of Friendship of Peoples
Recipients of the Order of Honour (Russia)
Recipients of the Order of the Red Banner of Labour
Members of the Federation Council of Russia (after 2000)